The Palestine lobby in the United States is organized by a number of groups seeking to influence the United States government to actively oppose Israel's occupation of the Palestinian territories, many of them members of the U.S. Campaign for Palestinian Rights. These organizations include peace and anti-war, human rights and Arab- and Muslim-American groups. Their tactics include education, protest, civil disobedience and lobbying.

History

Political activism against occupation first emerged in the wake of the Six-Day War when Israel conquered the West Bank, Gaza and the Golan Heights from Jordan, Egypt, and Syria.

Critics

Michael Lewis, director of Policy Analysis for the American Israel Public Affairs Committee criticizes a number of anti-occupation groups, contending that their goals are "to drive a wedge between the U.S. government and Israel; to undermine public and government support for Israel in the United States, and (especially since the 1973 war) to bring about a halt in American governmental aid to Israel."

In his book In the Trenches: Selected Speeches and Writings of an American Jewish Activist, David A. Harris, executive director of the American Jewish Committee says Israel must explain "how the occupation came about" and dismisses as "buzzwords" Palestinians attempts to gain sympathy as an occupied people.

See also

Projects working for peace among Arabs and Israelis
One-state solution
Two-state solution
Palestinian Right of Return
Anti-Israel lobby in the United States

References

Non-governmental organizations involved in the Israeli–Palestinian conflict
Foreign policy political advocacy groups in the United States
Arab-American organizations
Foreign policy lobbying organizations in the United States
Israel–United States relations
State of Palestine–United States relations